Terry Ray (born February 12, 1961) is an American actor, screenwriter, playwright and producer. Some of his work includes Gaydar (2002) and the long-running play Electricity (2016). Gaydar appeared in over 120 film festivals around the world, winning numerous awards and was recently named by California Independent Film Festival as one of the Best Short Comedy Films of the Decade. Ray is the creator and writer of Here TVs sitcom From Here on OUT, the first original gay sitcom created by a gay network. Terry stars in the sitcom, along with Juliet Mills, Suzanne Whang and T.J. Hoban.  Ray wrote and co-starred along with Dawn Wells in a series of spoofs of her classic Mary Ann character from Gilligan's Island called She's Still on That Freakin' Island.  Terry is also the co-writer and stars in the series My Sister Is So Gay with Loni Anderson who plays his mother.  The show also stars Tilky Jones, Wendy Michaels, Debra Wilson and Rae Dawn Chong.

Terry Ray is the playwright of the hit play Electricity which Ray has been starring in since 2016 and touring the country to rave reviews.  Electricity has become the longest running play in Palm Springs.

Terry Ray's 1987 appearance on Scrabble is noted as number 3 in the 10 Great Gay Moments in Game Show History, after Charles Nelson Reilly and Paul Lynde. In the same appearance, Terry was also named as one of the 5 Weirdest Game Show Contestants Ever, by Movieline.

Terry’s first professional writing job was the stage performance “Hollywood Goes Classical" at the venerable Dorothy Chandler Pavilion starring Mickey Rooney, Michael York, Dean Jones, Rhonda Fleming and several other classic film stars.  He wrote and starred in two more shows at the Dorothy Chandler Pavilion, one co-starring Amanda Bynes and the other Hilary Duff.

Each episode of Ray's series TV Therapy features a different classic TV character played once again by the original actor in therapy today with all the issues that character would have now.  Guest stars include Erin Murphy as Tabitha from Bewitched, Dawn Wells as Mary Ann from Gilligan's Island, Ted Lange as Isaac from The Love Boat, Kathy Garver as Cissy from Family Affair, Juliet Mills as Nanny in Nanny and the Professor, Bob Bergen as Porky Pig, Wesley Eure and Kathy Coleman as Will and Holly from Land of the Lost, Butch Patrick as Eddie from The Munsters, Alexandra Paul as Stephanie from Baywatch, Johnny Whitaker as Johnny in Sigmund and the Sea Monsters, and Jon Provost as Timmy from Lassie.

Terry is also the voice of the Gaydar Gun, a spinoff toy from the film Gaydar.

Ray has acted in over 100 plays in theaters across the country, sharing the stage with stars such as Elaine Stritch, Dixie Carter, Patricia Heaton and Matthew Perry.

Filmography

References

External links
 

1961 births
Living people
American male film actors
American male television actors
American gay actors